Willows at Chiajna (Romanian: Sălciile din Chiajna) is a landscape painting by the Romanian painter Ștefan Luchian  from 1905.

Description
The painting has dimensions of 45.8 x 55 centimeters. It is in the collection of the Art Museum of Cluj-Napoca.

Analysis
It depicts a group of willows by the Chiajna village outside Bucharest in the south-eastern Romania, and was painted in one day. The strong colors and thick layers of paint are typical for Luchian's works.

References

1905 paintings
Romanian paintings